"Judy" is a song written and originally released by Teddy Redell. Elvis Presley recorded the song and released it as a single in 1967.

Background

Elvis Presley recorded his version on Monday, March 13, 1961, in the RCA Studios in Nashville. His recording originally appeared as track 4 of side 2 of the album Something for Everybody, released in June 1961.

In 1967 two songs from the album, "Judy" and "There's Always Me", were released as a single. The song "Judy" reached number 78 on the Billboard Hot 100 for the week of September 30, 1967. while "There's Always Me" peaked at 56th during the previous two weeks.

Charts

References 

1960 songs
1967 singles
Elvis Presley songs
RCA Records singles